Konjščina is a village and municipality in  Krapina-Zagorje County in Croatia. According to the 2011 census, there are 3,790 inhabitants in the area, absolute majority which are Croats. It is connected by the D24 highway and R201 railway.

References

External links

Populated places in Krapina-Zagorje County
Municipalities of Croatia